Pudgy Takes a Bow-Wow is a 1937 Fleischer Studios animated short film starring Betty Boop and Pudgy the Pup. It was directed by Dave Fleischer and produced by Max Fleischer.

Synopsis
A marquee advertises "Betty Boop in Person" (and gives her 4 and 7/8 stars) at the theatre. Betty leaves Pudgy in her dressing room while she goes to perform her stage show. Her show involves singing a song, then impersonating a Chinese man and an Italian organ grinder. While she's singing, a kitten comes to the dressing room and Pudgy gets out and begins chasing it. They get onto the stage, and in the orchestra pit, and become part of the act, upstaging Betty.

Notes
 Most DVD releases cut out the part when Betty Boop impersonates a Chinese man. It cuts right to the cat in the dressing room meowing.
 This episode is in Public Domain.

References

External links
 Pudgy Takes a Bow-Wow at Big Cartoon DataBase.
Pudgy Takes a Bow-Wow on YouTube.

1937 short films
Betty Boop cartoons
1930s American animated films
American black-and-white films
1937 animated films
Paramount Pictures short films
Fleischer Studios short films
Short films directed by Dave Fleischer
Stereotypes of East Asian people
Film controversies
Race-related controversies in animation
Race-related controversies in film
1930s English-language films
American animated short films
Animated films about dogs
Animated films about cats
Films set in a theatre